Cyathostomum is a genus of nematodes belonging to the family Strongylidae.

The genus has cosmopolitan distribution.

Species:

Cyathostomum alveatum 
Cyathostomum catinatum 
Cyathostomum paternatum 
Cyathostomum spec 
Cyathostomum tetracanthum

References

Nematodes